Bálint Oláh (born 2 December 1994) is a Hungarian professional footballer who plays for Budafok.

Club career
On 28 May 2021, Oláh returned to his first club Diósgyőr.

On 31 August 2022, Oláh returned to Budafok.

Club statistics

Updated to games played as of 15 May 2021.

References

External links

1994 births
Living people
People from Miskolc
Hungarian footballers
Association football midfielders
Diósgyőri VTK players
Zalaegerszegi TE players
Mezőkövesdi SE footballers
Budafoki LC footballers
Nemzeti Bajnokság I players
Nemzeti Bajnokság II players